Kung Fu Pocong Perawan is an Indonesian horror-comedy film which was released in theaters on 12 April 2012. The film was directed by Yoyok Dumprink. This movie starred Olga Syahputra and Jessica Iskandar.

Plot
Memey (Jessica Iskandar) was kidnapped by Amsyong-Lu (Rizky Putra) when Amsyong-Lu strikes the kung fu school owned by her and Bohsiaw (Yadi Sembako). As a good friend, Angpao (Daus Mini) helps Bulb (Olga Syahputra), who is Memey's boyfriend, to save Memey from Amsyong-Lu. Unfortunately, on the way to save Memey, they crash and die but are forced to come back from the dead as "pocong" and in the end manage to save Memey.

Cast
 Jessica Iskandar as Memey
 Olga Syahputra as Bohlam
 Daus Mini as Angpao
 Yadi Sembako as Bohsiaw
 Rizky Putra as Amsyong-Lu

References

External links
 

2012 films
2012 comedy horror films
Indonesian comedy horror films